Charles Edward "Charlie" Peeler (born March 18, 1973) is an American attorney who was the United States Attorney for the United States District Court for the Middle District of Georgia from 2017 to 2020. He returned to private practice on January 4, 2021, joining Troutman Pepper.

Education and legal career

Originally from Albany, Georgia, he received his Bachelor of Science in biochemistry and molecular biology in 1995 from the University of Georgia and his Juris Doctor, cum laude, in 1999 from the University of Georgia School of Law. Before co-founding Flynn Peeler & Phillips in 2005, Peeler was an attorney at King & Spalding. His legal practice focused on complex civil litigation and federal criminal issues.

U.S. Attorney
On August 3, 2017, President Donald Trump nominated Peeler to become the United States Attorney for the Middle District of Georgia. On November 9, 2017, his nomination was confirmed by voice vote in the United States Senate. He was sworn into office on November 22, 2017.

During his tenure as U.S. Attorney, Peeler's office prosecuted crimes including federal firearms charges, fraudulent  tax returns, drug distribution, and bank robbery. Peeler resigned on December 11, 2020 and joined the national law firm Troutman Pepper in January 2021.

References

External links
 Biography at U.S. Department of Justice

1973 births
Living people
United States Attorneys for the Middle District of Georgia
University of Georgia alumni
University of Georgia School of Law alumni
21st-century American lawyers
People from Albany, Georgia